Panachaiki G.E. (Greek: Παναχαϊκή Γυμναστική Ένωση, Panachaiki Gymnastiki Enosi, "Pan-Achaean Gymnastic Union") is a Greek multi-sport club based in the city of Patras, Greece.

The history of Panachaiki began in 1891, when Panachaikos Gymnastikos Syllogos (Pan-Achaean Gymnastic Club) was founded. In 1894, a rival sports club, Gymnastiki Eteria Patron (Gymnastic Company of Patras), was founded in Patras by former Panachaikos' members.
It was only in 1923 that the two clubs agreed to merge, forming Panachaiki Gymnastiki Enosi.

Throughout a history of over 120 years, Panachaiki's athletes have won several Olympic medals. Emblematic figures in Panachaiki's history are weightlifter Dimitrios Tofalos and Kostas Davourlis, leader of the great football team that impressed Greece in the 1970s and took part in the 1974 UEFA Cup, being the first Greek countryside football club (outside Athens and Thessaloniki) to achieve that distinction.

Departments 
 Football
 Volleyball
 Basketball
 Boxing
 Athletics

Titles

Panachaiki athletics 

(Honours: 3 titles)

Greek Cross Country Championship, Men: (2): 1981, 1982
Greek Cross Country Championship, Women: (1): 1959

Panachaiki boxing 

(Honours: 5 titles)

Greek Championship, Men: (4): 2008, 2009, 2012, 2013
Greek Championship, Women: (1): 2019

Panachaiki beach volley 

(Honours: 2 titles)

Greek Championship, Men: (2) : 2010, 2011

Panachaiki G.E. Greek Olympic medalists 

 Nikolaos Andriakopoulos
 Antonios Pepanos
 Pantelis Karasevdas
 Stephanos Christopoulos
 Dimitrios Tofalos
 Themistoklis Diakidis
 Konstantinos Kozanitas
 Georgios Psachos
 Vassilios Psachos
 Konstantinos Lazaros

References
 
 
Rsssf, website about football statistics
Municipality of Patras, 100 years of football in Patras, 2006
Kokkovikas, K., The sports past of Achaia, 2004

Notes

External links
 Official sites
 Panachaiki Amateur Departments - official website

 Unofficial sites
Fansite "Axaioi-3"
Fansite "Red Black"

 
Sports clubs established in 1891
Achaea
Athletics clubs in Greece
Multi-sport clubs in Greece
Sport in Patras
1891 establishments in Greece